Hypselecara is a small genus of cichlids native to the Amazon and Orinoco basins in South America. H. temporalis is a relatively common aquarium fish known in the aquarium trade as the chocolate cichild.

Species
There are currently two recognized species in this genus:
 Hypselecara coryphaenoides (Heckel, 1840)
 Hypselecara temporalis (Günther, 1862) (Emerald cichlid)

References

Heroini
Fish of South America
Cichlid genera
Taxa named by Sven O. Kullander